Henry McMenemy (26 March 1912 – 1997) was a Scottish professional footballer who played as an inside forward.

Playing career

Club
Born in Glasgow, McMenemy played for Junior club Strathclyde in his hometown before moving to England and Newcastle United in 1931, aged 19.

He was one of six Scots in the Magpies side which won the FA Cup in his first season, beating the strong Arsenal team of the era in the final, and in the subsequent Charity Shield he scored twice against Everton but still finished on the losing side, with Dixie Dean scoring four as the match finished 5–3. McMenemy went on to make nearly 150 appearances in the Football League over six seasons, three in the top tier and three in the second following Newcastle's relegation in 1934.

In 1937 he returned to Scotland to join Dundee, reuniting with former Newcastle manager Andy Cunningham and teammate Jimmy Boyd; the club suffered relegation in his first campaign. He then reverted to Tyneside in 1939 to sign for Gateshead A.F.C., but the outbreak of World War II caused the abandonment of official football and McMenemy did not play a league match for the club. He did appear briefly for St Mirren during wartime.

International career
He received one call-up to the Scotland national team, but pulled out due to injury and was replaced by his brother.

Personal life
Harry was the son of Celtic player Jimmy, and his brother John was also a professional footballer; both also played in the inside forward position, and both won the Scottish Football League championship and the Scottish Cup during their careers. Another brother, Joe, featured for Strathclyde Juniors in the later 1930s. They are distantly related to Lawrie McMenemy.

References

1912 births
1997 deaths
Footballers from Glasgow
Scottish footballers
Strathclyde F.C. players
Scottish Junior Football Association players
Newcastle United F.C. players
English Football League players
Gateshead A.F.C. players
Dundee F.C. players
St Mirren F.C. wartime guest players
Scottish Football League players
Association football inside forwards
Harry
FA Cup Final players